Roger Richard Belanger (December 1, 1965 — September 16, 2011) was a Canadian professional ice hockey player. He played 44 games in the National Hockey League with the Pittsburgh Penguins during the 1984–85 season.

Playing career
Belanger started his junior career with the London Knights of the OHL in 1982–83, getting 31 points (17 goals and 14 assists) in 68 games. However, an injury in the playoffs limited him to just one game, in which he had no points. Prior to the 1983–84 season, the Knights dealt Belanger to the Kingston Canadians. His offensive production exploded in Kingston, as he registered 90 points (44 goals and 46 assist in 67 games. The Canadians failed to make the playoffs that season. In the 1984 NHL Entry Draft, the Pittsburgh Penguins chose Belanger with their third pick of the first round, the 16th choice overall, following their selections of Mario Lemieux (1st overall) and Doug Bodger (8th).

Belanger stepped right into the rebuilding Penguins' lineup in the 1984–85 season, and had eight points (three goals and five assists) in 44 games. The Penguins sent him back to the OHL, where his rights were traded to the Hamilton Steelhawks and in three regular season games in Hamilton, Belanger had six points (3G-3A). Belanger helped the Steelhawks in the playoffs with 13 points, including three goals, in 17 games.

In 1985–86, Belanger failed to crack the Penguins' lineup and found himself with the Baltimore Skipjacks of the AHL, as he recorded 17 goals and 38 points in 69 games in what proved to be the last injury-free season of his career.  The following year Belanger played in 32 games with Baltimore, getting 20 points (nine goals and 11 assists), then spent time with the Muskegon Lumberjacks of the IHL, where he had a goal and two assists in five games. In 1987–88, Belanger was beset with numerous injuries and played in just five games with the Lumberjacks, getting a goal and three assists, then played two games with the New Haven Nighthawks of the AHL, where he went scoreless.

That proved to be the end of Belanger's playing career, as he retired from hockey in 1988 due to injuries.

Death 
Belanger died September 16, 2011, from a heart attack at his home in Welland, Ontario, age 45.

Career statistics

Regular season and playoffs

References

External links

1965 births
2011 deaths
Baltimore Skipjacks players
Canadian ice hockey centres
Hamilton Steelhawks players
Ice hockey people from Ontario
Kingston Canadians players
London Knights players
Muskegon Lumberjacks players
National Hockey League first-round draft picks
New Haven Nighthawks players
Pittsburgh Penguins draft picks
Pittsburgh Penguins players
Sportspeople from St. Catharines